John Otis is the name of:

John Otis (Maine politician) (1801–1856), U.S. Representative from Maine
John G. Otis (1838–1916), U.S. Representative from Kansas
John Lord Otis (1827-1894), American Civil War officer and Massachusetts state senator and state representative
Johnny Otis (1921–2012), American musician